Jayan quotes (ജയൻ ചൊല്ലുകൾ) or Jayan dialogues (ജയൻ ഡയലോഗുകൾ) are satirical quotes of superhuman strength in Malayalam that are based on the late action star Jayan who was a famed stunt performer during his movie career. Jayan worked in malayalam cinema, a sector of the Indian movie industry based in Kerala and was a highly popular stunt actor of his time. Jayan quotes began as an internet & sms phenomenon amongst malayalees around the world in the early 2000s as part of the Jayan phenomenon & resurgence which started in the late 1990s. These satirical quotes are the first known collection of its kind from anywhere in the world (other factoids like those on Chuck Norris, Kyle Katarn, Rajnikanth, Dharmendra etc. emerged later after 2004). Soon the quotes attained mainstream popularity and have become an integral part of popular culture in Kerala.

Origin

Jayan's superhuman image
The idea behind the origin of the quotes can be traced back to the action thrillers of the late 1970s in Malayalam which were filled with high risk stunt performances from Jayan who seldom relied on stunt doubles. Through such monumental stunt feats, his machismo image, masculine base voice and unique attire like elvis bellbottoms, Jayan had attained a reallife superhero image at the peak of his career. After his death in a helicopter accident while performing a stunt, these gradually paved way to the actor transforming into a legend over time while the fascination towards his image & style remained dormant in later generations, eventually giving rise to his persona's depiction as a comic superhero and in the process, the Jayan quotes.

1990s Mimics Movement
Jayan quotes is related to the popularity of mimicry, an artform of imitation, comedy skits and impersonation, which gained mainstream fame among malayalee communities in the 1990s. Mimics sector was going through a period of stagnation with washed up ideas and worn out programs and at one point of time, was even facing a threat of dying out. It was during this crisis period that some groups decided to exploit Jayan's image and devised impersonations & skits based on Jayan persona which became instant hits giving rise to full scale commercialisation of the persona which was presented as a comic superhero who frequently delivered signature quotes demonstrating superhuman strength.

Format
Jayan quotes follow a unique pattern in that these are dialogues which are almost always in first person (unlike other trending factoids & jokes which are in third person). These dialogues are depicted as being said by Jayan or the person in the Jayan persona (although the actor has never uttered a single such quote in his lifetime). All known Jayan quotes are originally in Malayalam language which are translated to English in this article. Most of the quotes follow a general format; If there was "this", could've turned into "that" or If "this" was available, (I) could've done "that". For example, a popular Jayan quote is "If there was a football field with four wells, could've played a game of carrom". There are also quotes which do not follow this general rule such as another quote which says: "What? the money purse in my pocket was actually a cement bag?"

Voice & Style
The voice style used to say Jayan quotes actually come from the style of dialogue delivery in Jayan films released after the actor's death in which the voice was dubbed by Alleppey Ashraf, a popular mimicry artist of the time. Although the tone does resemble Jayan's original sound, the voice imitated widely in mimics programs and grotesquely used style is that of Alleppey Ashraf. Actor Jayan is not known to have ever uttered a single Jayan quote during his life.

Popular quotes
English translations of some of the highly popular quotes are given below:
 Had I got a python, could have used it as a belt
 If a storm blew, could've enjoyed the breeze.
 If a volcano blew, could've enjoyed the warmth.
 If the sun could be reached, could've enjoyed a sun bath.
 If a knife was available, could've pricked the skin.
 If there was an elephant here, could've done some wrestling (same quote replacing elephant by "crocodile")

See also
 Chuck Norris facts

Bibliography 
 Mathrubhumi Weekly, November 21, 2010
 Chithrabhumi, November 25, 2010

References 

Internet memes